Ahmedabad (Punjabi), previously called Mandi Hira Singh  is a city and Municipal Committee of Depalpur Tehsil in Okara District in the Punjab province of Pakistan. This city was renamed in 1993 by the Government of the Punjab in respect for Services of Mirza Ahmed Baig Famous local politician. It is a Union Council, an administrative subdivision, of Depalpur Tehsil and is part of the NA-144 constituency of the National Assembly.

References

Cities and towns in Okara District
Okara District
Union councils of Okara District